Eleonora Vegliante (born 21 July 1973) is a Venezuelan former professional tennis player.

A Central American and Caribbean Games bronze medalist for Venezuela, Vegliante competed for her nation's Federation Cup team between 1990 and 1993, appearing in a total of 11 ties. She won four singles and five doubles rubbers.

Vegliante later played tennis for Campbell University and now lives in Atlanta, Georgia.

ITF finals

Doubles: 3 (1–2)

References

External links
 
 
 

1973 births
Living people
Venezuelan female tennis players
Competitors at the 1990 Central American and Caribbean Games
Central American and Caribbean Games bronze medalists for Venezuela
Central American and Caribbean Games medalists in tennis
20th-century Venezuelan women
21st-century Venezuelan women